MV Finlaggan is a drive-through vehicle and passenger ferry built in Poland for Caledonian Maritime Assets Limited. From 2011, she has been operated by Caledonian MacBrayne on the Islay service from Kennacraig.

History
MV Finlaggan was built in Gdańsk for the Kennacraig - Islay route. Launched on 30 June 2010, she arrived in Scotland in May 2011. During trials, she developed engine problems, forcing cancellation of the inaugural sailing. She had further problems with her bow doors, requiring withdrawal from service for overhaul of her hydraulic systems in Birkenhead.

Layout
Finlaggan is of Ro-Ro design with bow and stern ramps. She is the first CalMac ship to have "clam shell" bow doors, that open sideways. The car deck is partially open at the stern and has a mezzanine deck capable of transporting an additional 18 cars.

She has three passenger decks, two with external panoramic seating. There is a restaurant, shop, and two disabled lifts serving all decks. Entering through doors on the car deck, stairs provides access to a lounge with a bar/coffee shop, games room and baggage storage. A further staircase, with a statue in the middle, goes to an upper deck which has the cafeteria, a lounge with dog areas, a children's play area and televisions.

Service
Finlaggan has taken up the Kennacraig – Islay route, releasing . During the winter months, she often relieves on the Uig Triangle.

References

External links

MV Finlaggan on www.calmac.co.uk
Image on the Mersey
Pictures during construction

2010 ships
Caledonian MacBrayne
Islay
Ships built in Gdańsk